The Ruichang China Masters is a Super 100 badminton tournament under the new BWF Tour format held in China. Previously it was known as China Asia Satellite in 2001, China International Challenge in 2014–2017 and Lingshui China Masters in 2018–2019. In 2023, the Super 100 tournament moved from Lingshui, Hainan to Ruichang, Jiangxi.

Previous winners

Performances by nation

References 

 
Badminton tournaments in China